Nar Bahadur Chand is a member of 2nd Nepalese Constituent Assembly. He won Baitadi–2 seat in CA assembly, 2013 from Nepali Congress.

References

Nepali Congress politicians from Sudurpashchim Province
Living people
1962 births
People from Baitadi District
Members of the 2nd Nepalese Constituent Assembly